Carlo Francesco Nuvolone (1608 or 1609 in Milan – 1661 or 1662 in Milan) was an Italian painter of religious subjects and portraits who was active mainly in Lombardy.  He became the leading painter in Lombardy in the mid-17th century, producing works on canvas as well as frescoes. Because his style was perceived as close to that of Guido Reni he was nicknamed il Guido della Lombardia (the Guido of Lombardy).

Life
Carlo Francesco Nuvolone was born in Milan. His father Panfilo Nuvolone was a painter of frescoes and altarpieces, in a style still linked to late Mannerism, and of still lifes.  Carlo Francesco had a brother called Giuseppe who also became a painter.

After working with his father, Carlo Francesco studied at the Accademia Ambrosiana in Milan under Giovanni Battista Crespi (il Cerano). In that studio he would have encountered Daniele Crespi and Giulio Cesare Procaccini.

He later worked in Milan and its environs.  During the 1650s, Nuvolone painted frescoes for the Cappella di San Michele in the Certosa di Pavia and contributed to the decorations of the sacro monte (hillside shrine) at Varese, an important local pilgrimage site. He later also painted frescos at the Sacro Monte di Orta. His brother occasionally assisted him with his fresco work.

Among his pupils were Giuseppe Zanata, Federigo Panza, Filippo Abbiati, and Pietro Maggi.

Work
Carlo Francesco Nuvolone worked as an easel painter as well as a fresco artist.  His subjects were mainly religious and he realised many altarpieces and devotional works.  He also left a number of portraits. 

His early works showed the influence of the latest developments in Lombard painting. He had in particular adopted from Giulio Cesare Procaccini the close attention to the handling of light and shadow as well as the careful study of facial expressions.  Other early influences include Daniele Crespi and Francesco Cairo.  His first signed and dated work, the Miracle of St Martha (1636, Venegono Inferiore, Seminario Arcivescovile) also shows the influence of Morazzone.  The Death of Lucrezia, executed in several versions, reveals the soft, atmospheric quality of his art, often explained by Murillo's work, although it is not clear where he would have seen Murillo's works.

His altarpieces from the 1640s, such as the Assumption of the Virgin (Pinacoteca di Brera, Milan), demonstrate his interest in Anthony van Dyck.  An outstanding example from this period is The purification of the Virgin (1645, Museo Civico, Piacenza).

Nuvolone was also active as a portrait painter working in the Lombard style with its penchant for a strikingly detailed portrayal of the sitter's features and garments and a lively depiction of the play of light and shadow. These portraits also show influences from portrait painting in Genoa, which in turn was influenced by the Flemish portrait painters such as van Dyck who had resided there.

He painted, together with his brother, a portrait of the family Nuvolone showing him at his easel surrounded by his family, including his father and brother and a few young people playing musical instruments.

References

External links

1608 births
1609 births
1661 deaths
1662 deaths
17th-century Italian painters
Italian male painters
Fresco painters
18th-century Italian painters
Painters from Milan
Italian Baroque painters
18th-century Italian male artists